Athey's Chapel Cemetery (also known as Rome Cemetery) is located in Rome, Kentucky. The cemetery has 70 interments, but many of the headstones are damaged and have weed overgrowth on them. The cemetery was probably founded in 1820.

References

External links
 

Cemeteries in Kentucky
Buildings and structures in Daviess County, Kentucky
1820 establishments in Kentucky